Ottavio Corsini (12 August 1588 – 30 July 1641) was a Roman Catholic prelate who served as Titular Archbishop of Tarsus (1621–1641) and Apostolic Nuncio to Florence (1621–1623).

Biography
Ottavio Corsini was born in Florence, Italy on 12 August 1588.
On 17 March 1621, he was appointed during the papacy of Pope Gregory XV as Titular Archbishop of Tarsus.
On 21 March 1621, he was consecrated bishop by Ottavio Bandini, Cardinal-Priest of San Lorenzo in Lucina, with Ulpiano Volpi, Bishop of Novara, and 
Innocenzo Massimi, Bishop of Bertinoro, serving as co-consecrators. 
On 4 April 1621, he was appointed during the papacy of Pope Gregory XV as Apostolic Nuncio to Florence, a position he held until his resignation on 30 December 1623
He served as Titular Archbishop of Tarsus until his death on 30 July 1641.

Episcopal succession
While bishop, he was the principal co-consecrator of:
Stefano Durazzo, Archbishop of Genoa (1635); 
Diego Requeséns, Titular Archbishop of Cartagine (1637); and  
Prospero Spínola, Bishop of Luni e Sarzana (1637),

References 

17th-century Roman Catholic titular bishops
Bishops appointed by Pope Gregory XV
1588 births
1641 deaths